Counterfeit Lady is a 1936 American comedy film directed by D. Ross Lederman.

Cast
 Ralph Bellamy as Johnny Pierce
 Joan Perry as Phyllis Fowler
 Douglass Dumbrille as August Marino
 George McKay as Pinky
 Gene Morgan as Clancy
 Henry Mollison as Bemis
 John Tyrrell as Mike
 Max Hoffman Jr. as Kit
 Edward LeSaint as Girard
 John Harrington as Swanson

References

External links

1936 films
1936 comedy films
American comedy films
American black-and-white films
1930s English-language films
Films directed by D. Ross Lederman
Columbia Pictures films
1930s American films